The Berlin-Liga (VI), formerly the Verbandsliga Berlin, is the highest league for football teams exclusively in the German capital. Since German reunification in 1990, it has been the highest level of domestic football in the city, replacing the Amateur-Oberliga Berlin in this position. After the 2007–08 season the Verbandsliga was renamed Berlin-Liga.

It is the sixth tier of the German football league system. Until the introduction of the 3. Liga in 2008 it was the fifth tier of the league system; until the introduction of the Regionalligen in 1994 the fourth tier.

Overview 
The Berlin-Liga was formed in 1992 as the Verbandsliga Berlin from sixteen clubs in West and East Berlin. It was the first time since 1950, when the East Berlin sides left the Oberliga Berlin to play in the East German football league system, that clubs from both halves of the city played in the same Berlin-wide league. It replaced the Landesliga Berlin as the fourth tier of the German league system in Berlin; the Landesliga had in the previous season been expanded to two divisions to integrate the clubs from East Berlin.

In the 1992–93 season, the league winner was promoted to the NOFV-Oberliga Mitte; since then the winner of the league each year has been promoted to the NOFV-Oberliga Nord, together with the winners of the Brandenburg-Liga and the Verbandsliga Mecklenburg-Vorpommern, while the relegated teams go to the Landesliga Berlin Staffel 1 and Landesliga Berlin Staffel 2.

Founding members of the league
The Verbandsliga was formed in 1992 from sixteen clubs from four leagues, these clubs being:

From the NOFV-Oberliga Mitte:
 SC Gatow
 SV Lichtenberg 47
 BSV Spindlersfeld, became BSV Marzahn
 FV Wannsee

From the NOFV-Oberliga Nord:
 BFC Preussen
 Wacker 04 Berlin

From the Landesliga Berlin-Staffel I:
 1. FC Wilmersdorf
 SC Staaken
 Köpenicker SC
 Frohnauer SC
 SC Rapide Wedding

From the Landesliga Berlin-Staffel II:
 SC Schwarz Weiss Spandau
 Spandauer SC Teutonia
 SV Tasmania 73 Neukölln
 FC Wacker Lankwitz
 SG Eumako Weißensee, became Weißenseer FC

League champions 
The league champions:

References

Sources 
 Deutschlands Fußball in Zahlen,  An annual publication with tables and results from the Bundesliga to Verbandsliga/Landesliga. DSFS.
 Kicker Almanach,  The yearbook on German football from Bundesliga to Oberliga, since 1937. Kicker Sports Magazine.
 Die Deutsche Liga-Chronik 1945-2005  History of German football from 1945 to 2005 in tables. DSFS. 2006.

External links 
 The North East German Football Association (NOFV) 
 Berlin Football Association 
 Berlin-Liga 

Football competitions in Berlin
1992 establishments in Germany
Sports leagues established in 1992